The Arthur C. Cope Award is a prize awarded for achievement in the field of organic chemistry research. It is sponsored by the Arthur C. Cope Fund, and has been awarded annually since 1973 by the American Chemical Society. It consists of $25,000, a medallion, and $150,000 in funding for research in organic chemistry.

Recipients include:

2022 – Véronique Gouverneur
2021 – John Hartwig
2020 – Dennis A. Dougherty
2019 – Dieter Seebach
2018 – Steven V. Ley
2017 – Carolyn R. Bertozzi
2016 – Eric N. Jacobsen
2015 – Paul A. Wender
2014 – Stuart Schreiber
2013 – Stephen L. Buchwald
2012 – Chi-Huey Wong
2011 – Nicholas Turro
2010 – Kendall N. Houk
2009 – Manfred T. Reetz
2008 – J. Fraser Stoddart
2007 – Jean Fréchet 
2006 – Peter G. Schultz
2005 – K.C. Nicolaou
2004 – Barry M. Trost
2003 – Larry E. Overman
2002 – Robert H. Grubbs
2001 – George A. Olah
2000 – David A. Evans
1999 – Ralph F. Hirschmann
1998 – Samuel J. Danishefsky
1997 – Ryōji Noyori
1996 – Robert G. Bergman
1995 – George M. Whitesides
1994 – John D. Roberts
1993 – Peter B. Dervan
1992 – K. Barry Sharpless
1991 – Gerhard L. Closs
1990 – Koji Nakanishi
1989 – William S. Johnson, Norman Allinger
1988 – Kenneth B. Wiberg
1987 – Ronald Breslow
1986 – Duilio Arigoni
1984 – Albert J. Eschenmoser
1982 – Frank H. Westheimer
1980 – Gilbert J. Stork
1978 – 
1976 – Elias J. Corey
1974 – Donald J. Cram
1973 – Roald Hoffmann and Robert B. Woodward

Arthur C. Cope Scholar Awards
The Arthur C. Cope Fund also sponsors an additional ten awards each year called the Arthur C. Cope Scholar Awards  to recognize and encourage excellence in organic chemistry. The Arthur C. Cope Scholar Awards were established in 1984 by the ACS Board of Directors, on recommendation of the ACS Division of Organic Chemistry, under the terms of the will of Arthur C. Cope.

See also

 List of chemistry awards

References

Awards of the American Chemical Society
Awards established in 1973